The 2021 World Men's Curling Championship (branded as the 2021 BKT Tires & OK Tire World Men's Curling Championship for sponsorship reasons) was held from April 2 to 11 at the Markin MacPhail Centre at Canada Olympic Park in Calgary, Canada. The event was originally to be held in Ottawa, but due to the COVID-19 pandemic, the championship was moved to Calgary. The event was held in a bio-secure bubble at Canada Olympic Park, which also hosted all major Curling Canada championships leading up to the Worlds (including the 2021 Tim Hortons Brier, which determined Canada's entrant). All events were held behind closed doors with no spectators.

The 2021 championship fielded the largest number of teams in the history of the event, with fourteen total. Niklas Edin, skip of Team Sweden, and his third, Oskar Eriksson, won a record fifth career World Championship. The team, which also consisted of Rasmus Wranå and Christoffer Sundgren, won a record third straight championship. They defeated Team Scotland, skipped by Bruce Mouat in the final, 10–5. With the game tied at 5 in the ninth end, Edin made a double take out with the last rock of the end to score five. Down by 5 with just one end to go, Team Scotland then conceded the game. Switzerland, skipped by Peter de Cruz, won the bronze medal.

The championship served as one of two qualification events for curling at the 2022 Winter Olympics in Beijing. The National Olympic Committees representing the top six finishers at the tournament qualified directly to the Olympic tournament. In order of ranking, this included Sweden, Great Britain, Switzerland, the ROC, the United States, and Canada. The remaining teams that had qualified for the 2020 or 2021 World Championships competed in the World Curling Federation's Olympic Qualification Event in December 2021 for the remaining three spots.

Impact of the COVID-19 pandemic
On April 9, the World Curling Federation announced that a positive COVID-19 test had been recorded by a player on a non-playoff team, and that the second qualification match between the United States and Switzerland would be therefore be postponed. The World Curling Federation postponed all games scheduled for April 10 due to additional positive tests involving a member of a playoff team. There were three initial positives from players on non-playoff teams who were tested as part of the exit protocols, and four close contacts were also identified.

On April 11, following approval by Alberta Health Services (AHS), the World Curling Federation announced that play would resume, with all remaining games being played throughout the day. One playoff team member who had been fully vaccinated initially tested positive, but later tested negative and was cleared to participate in the playoffs. Enhanced biosecurity protocols were mandated for the remainder of the tournament, including additional tests before and after each game, and requiring masks to be worn on-ice. Canadian broadcaster TSN pulled its camera crew for the U.S./Switzerland match, and announced that the game would not be televised due to unspecified "COVID-19 issues"; the game was still broadcast via the WCF host feed.

On April 12, all four tests were deemed false positives following an extensive review by health authorities. Team USA third Christopher Plys announced on Twitter that he was the playoff-bound curler who had tested positive.

Qualification
The following nations qualified to participate in the 2021 World Men's Curling Championship:

Pursuant to a December 2020 ruling by the Court of Arbitration for Sport, Russia is prohibited from competing under its flag or any national symbols at any Olympic Games or world championships through December 16, 2022, and must compete neutrally. The World Curling Federation listed the Russian team as the abbreviation "RCF", for the Russian Curling Federation.

World Ranking
The World Curling Federation World Ranking tracks and lists the success of all Member Associations.

Teams
The teams are as follows:

WCF ranking
Year to date World Curling Federation order of merit ranking for each team prior to the event. Rankings based on the 2019–20 season.

Round-robin standings
Final round-robin standings

Round-robin results

All times listed in Mountain Daylight Time (UTC−06:00).

Draw 1
Friday, April 2, 9:00 am

Draw 2
Friday, April 2, 2:00 pm

Draw 3
Friday, April 2, 7:00 pm

Draw 4
Saturday, April 3, 9:00 am

Draw 5
Saturday, April 3, 2:00 pm

Draw 6
Saturday, April 3, 7:00 pm

Draw 7
Sunday, April 4, 9:00 am

Draw 8
Sunday, April 4, 2:00 pm

Draw 9
Sunday, April 4, 7:00 pm

Draw 10
Monday, April 5, 9:00 am

Draw 11
Monday, April 5, 2:00 pm

Draw 12
Monday, April 5, 7:00 pm

Draw 13
Tuesday, April 6, 9:00 am

Draw 14
Tuesday, April 6, 2:00 pm

Draw 15
Tuesday, April 6, 7:00 pm

Draw 16
Wednesday, April 7, 9:00 am

Draw 17
Wednesday, April 7, 2:00 pm

Draw 18
Wednesday, April 7, 7:00 pm

Draw 19
Thursday, April 8, 9:00 am

Draw 20
Thursday, April 8, 2:00 pm

Draw 21
Thursday, April 8, 7:00 pm

Draw 22
Friday, April 9, 9:00 am

Draw 23
Friday, April 9, 2:00 pm

Playoffs

Qualification Game 1
Friday, April 9, 7:00 pm

Qualification Game 2
Sunday, April 11, 11:00 am

Semifinals
Sunday, April 11, 4:00 pm

Bronze medal game
Sunday, April 11, 9:00 pm

Final
Sunday, April 11, 9:00 pm

Statistics

Top 5 player percentages
Final round robin percentages

Perfect games
Minimum 10 shots thrown

Awards
The awards were as follows:

Collie Campbell Memorial Award
 Oskar Eriksson, Sweden

Notes

References

World Men's Curling Championship
World Championship
Curling competitions in Calgary
2021 in Alberta
World Curling Championship